The San Francisco Zoo is a  zoo located in the southwestern corner of San Francisco, California, between Lake Merced and the Pacific Ocean along the Great Highway. The SF Zoo is a public institution, managed by the non-profit San Francisco Zoological Society, a 501(c)(3) organization. As of 2016, the zoo housed more than one thousand individual animals, representing more than 250 species. It is noted as the birthplace of Koko the gorilla, and, from 1974 to 2016, the home of Elly, the oldest black rhinoceros in North America.

The zoo's main entrance (one located on the north side across Sloat Boulevard and one block south of the Muni Metro L Taraval line) is to the west, on the ocean side.

History

Originally named the Fleishhacker Zoo after its founder, banker and San Francisco Parks Commission president Herbert Fleishhacker, planning for construction began in 1929, on the site adjacent to what was once the largest swimming pool in the United States, the Fleishhacker Pool.  The area was also already home to a children’s zoo and playground, an original (circa 1921) Michael Dentzel/Marcus Illions carousel, and the Mother’s Building, a lounge for women and their children. Most of the exhibits were populated with animals transferred from Golden Gate Park, including two zebras, a cape buffalo, five rhesus monkeys, two spider monkeys, and three elephants (Virginia, Marjorie, and Babe).

The first exhibits built in the 1930s cost $3.5 million, which included Monkey Island, Lion House, Elephant House, a small mammal grotto, an aviary, and bear grottos. These spacious, ha-haed enclosures were among the first bar-less exhibits in the country. In 1955, a local San Francisco newspaper purchased Pennie, a baby female Asian elephant, and donated her to the zoo after many children donated their pennies, nickels, and dimes for her purchase.

Over the next forty years, the Zoological Society became a powerful fundraising source for the San Francisco Zoo, just as Fleishhacker had hoped when he envisioned: "…a Zoological Society similar to those established in other large cities. The Zoological Society will aid the Parks Commission in the acquisition of rare animals and in the operation of the zoo."  True to its charter, the Society immediately exerted its influence on the zoo, obtaining more than 1,300 annual memberships in its first ten years (nearly 25,000 today). It also funded projects like the renovation of the Children’s Zoo in 1964, development of the African Scene in 1967, the purchase of medical equipment for the new zoo Hospital in 1975, and the establishment of the Avian Conservation Center in 1978.

In November 2004, Tinkerbelle, San Francisco Zoo's last Asian elephant, was moved to ARK 2000, a sanctuary run by PAWS-Performing Animal Welfare Society located in the Sierra Nevada foothills. She was later joined in March 2005 by the African elephant Lulu, the last elephant on display at the zoo. The moves followed the highly publicized deaths of thirty-eight-year-old Calle in March 2004, and forty-three-year-old Maybelle the following month.

In early 2006, the SF Zoo announced its offer to name a soon-to-hatch American bald eagle after comedian Stephen Colbert. The publicity and goodwill garnered from coverage of the event on the Colbert Report was a windfall for the zoo and the city of San Francisco. Stephen Jr. was born on April 17, 2006.

Exhibit renovations

 Otter River (1994) featuring North American river otters
 Feline Conservation Center (1994) housing three species of small cats, including the snow leopard, ocelot, and Malayan fishing cats
 Spectacled bear exhibit renovation (1994)
 Lion House outdoor enclosures (1994)
 Eagle Island renovation (1995) providing a home for Sureshot, an injured (and non-releasable) bald eagle
 Australian WalkAbout (1995) new space for red kangaroos and emus
 Flamingo Lake renovation (1995)
 Monkey Island demolition (1995)
 Hippopotamus exhibit renovation (1995)
 Warthog exhibit (1996)
 Billabong (1996)
 Aviary renovation (1996)
 Ring-tailed lemur exhibit renovation (1996)
 Children’s Zoo entrance (1996)
 Kodiak bear exhibit (1996)
 Avian Conservation Center (1997)
 African lion cub exhibit (1997)
 Aye-aye Forest (1997)
 Asian elephant exhibit renovations (1997 and 1999)
 Rainbow Landing (now Lorikeet Landing) (1998)
 Outdoor aviary demolition (1998)
 Restoration of Little Puffer (miniature railroad) (1998)
 Primate Discovery Center terrace exhibit renovation (1998)
 Children’s Zoo renovation (1999)
 Puente al Sur (1999) now houses giant anteaters, mountain tapirs, and capybara

 Infrastructure replacement (1999)
 Aviary renovation (2000) depicts a South American tropical forest, complete with birds, caiman, and an anaconda
 Seal pool/bear exhibits (2000)
 Connie and Bob Lurie Education Center (2001)
 Koret Animal Resource Center (2001)
 Expanded Children’s Zoo and Family Farm (2001)
 Wetlands habitat (2001)
 Cassowary Exhibit (2001) features double-wattled cassowaries, one of the world's largest bird species
 Lipman Family Lemur Forest (2002) houses five species of Madagascan primates in an outdoor forest
 Friend and Taube Entry Village (2002)
 Leaping Lemur Café (2002)
 Split Mound artwork by McCarren/Fine (2002)
 Bronze lion sculptures by Gwynn Murrill (2002)
 Zoo Street and parking (2002)
 Dentzel Carousel (2002)
 African Savanna (2004) features giraffe, zebra, kudu, ostrich and other African wildlife roaming together in a lush, 3 acre (1 ha) habitat.
 African Savanna Giraffe Feedings (2006)
 Black swan exhibit (2006)
 Binnowee Landing and Feeding (formerly Lorikeet Landing) (2006)
 Kunekune pig exhibit at the Family Farm (formerly the miniature pig exhibit) (2006)
 Hearst Grizzly Gulch exhibit (opened June 14, 2007)
 Big Cat Exhibit Renovations (January 2008)
 Hippopotamus and Rhinoceros exhibits (the 2 hippos, Puddles and Cuddles, died during renovation) (2007–2009)
 Little Puffer restoration (2009)
 South American Tropical Rainforest Aviary asbestos removal (2009–2010)
 Fishing cat exhibit (2010)
 Mexican wolf canyon (2016)
 Expanded Snow leopard habitat (2022)

Animals and exhibits 

Indian peafowl roam the zoo grounds freely. The zoo also has Chilean flamingos.

African Region

Leanne B. Roberts African Savanna 
Grant's zebra
Greater kudu
Common ostrich
Reticulated giraffe
Black crowned crane
Grey crowned crane

African Aviary 
Blue-bellied roller
Hadada ibis
Hamerkop
Long-tailed glossy starling
Northern bald ibis

Jones Family Gorilla Preserve 
Western lowland gorilla

Doelger Primate Discovery Center 
Bald eagle
Coquerel's sifaka
François' langur
Mandrill

Lipman Family Lemur Forest 
Black-and-white ruffed lemur
Blue-eyed black lemur
Crowned lemur
Red-bellied lemur
Red-fronted lemur
Ring-tailed lemur

Great Ape Passage 
Chimpanzee
Bornean orangutan

Cat Kingdom 
African lion
Black rhinoceros
Bobcat
Eastern bongo
Fishing cat
Indian rhinoceros
Komodo dragon
North American river otter
Pygmy hippopotamus
Snow leopard
Sumatran tiger
Wolverine

Penguin Island
Magellanic penguin

Outback Trail 
Common wallaroo
Emu
Koala
Red kangaroo
Southern cassowary

South America

Puente al Sur
Black-necked swan
Giant anteater
Greater rhea
Guanaco
Red-and-green macaw
White-faced whistling duck

South American Tropical Rainforest and Aviary
Amazon tree boa
American white ibis
Blue-headed macaw
Blue-throated piping guan
Blue-winged teal
Boa constrictor
Crested oropendola
Curl-crested aracari
Dyeing poison dart frog
Emerald tree boa
Golfodulcean poison frog
Great curassow
Green anaconda
Green and black poison dart frog
Honduran spiny-tailed iguana
Linnaeus's two-toed sloth
Northern caiman lizard
Panamanian golden frog
Plumed basilisk
Red-eyed tree frog
Red-footed tortoise
Red-lored amazon
Roseate spoonbill
Ruddy duck
Scarlet ibis
Smoky jungle frog

Bear Country 
American black bear
American white pelican
Chacoan peccary
Grizzly bear
Mexican wolf
Pink-backed pelican

Exploration Zone 
Black-tailed prairie dog
Kunekune
Meerkat
Red panda
Red-rumped agouti
Rosy-faced lovebird
Spectacled owl

Safety incidents and animal deaths

2007 tiger attacks

On December 22, 2006, Tatiana, the 242-pound Siberian tiger, attacked zookeeper Lori Komejan, causing the keeper to be hospitalized for several weeks with lacerated limbs and shock. The Lion House was closed for ten months as a result.  California's Division of Occupation Safety and Health found the zoo liable for the keeper's injuries, fined the zoo, and ordered safety improvements.

On December 25, 2007, the same tiger escaped from her grotto and attacked three zoo visitors after being taunted and pummeled by sticks and pine cones by the visitors. Carlos Sousa, 17, of San Jose, California, was killed at the scene, while another taunter was mauled and survived.  The tiger was shot and killed by police while hiding in the landscape after the attack.  Three other tigers who shared Tatiana's grotto did not escape. Tatiana arrived at the San Francisco Zoo from the Denver Zoo in 2005, in hopes that she would mate. (This "Tatiana" is not the same as the one successfully breeding in the Toronto Zoo). According to the Association of Zoos and Aquariums, the attack is the first visitor fatality due to animal escape at a member zoo in the history of the organization.

Other incidents
In October 2020, a 30-year-old man was arrested when he stole an endangered ring-tailed lemur named Maki. He was charged in July 2021 for a violation of the Endangered Species Act. He faces $50,000 in fines and as much as one year in prison. Maki was found the day after he was kidnapped at a playground in Daly City and was returned to the zoo.

Conservation
Two black bears were rescued as orphans in Alaska. The male was found on the edges of town near Valdez in May 2017 and the female cub was found near Juneau in June 2017. Both cubs were determined by the Alaska Department of Fish and Game to be motherless and were brought to Alaska Zoo and rehabilitated back to health. In 2017, the Alaska Zoo had more orphaned bear cubs than ever before, due to the repeal of bear hunting regulations by the Trump administration, which allowed for the hunting of hibernating bears in their dens. Mr. Lampi said.  The two bears were brought to the San Francisco Zoo in 2017 and a previously empty habitat was repurposed to host them.

The zoo housed Henry, a 10-year-old blind California sea lion who was found stranded on a beach in Humboldt County in 2010. In 2012, he was brought to the San Francisco Zoo, he was treated by veterinarians for his blindness.

Species survival projects
The San Francisco Zoo participates in Species Survival Plans, conservation programs sponsored by the Association of Zoos and Aquariums. The program began in 1981 for selected species in North American zoos and aquariums where the breeding of a species done to maintain healthy, self-sustaining, genetically diverse and demographically stable populations.  The zoo participates in more than 30 SSP programs, working to conserve species ranging from Madagascan radiated tortoises and reticulated giraffes to black rhinos and gorillas.

See also

Citizens Lobbying for Animals in Zoos

References

External links

Zoos in California
Parks in San Francisco
Sunset District, San Francisco
Insectariums
Landmarks in San Francisco
Urban public parks
Zoos established in 1929
1929 establishments in California
Tourist attractions in San Francisco